Halsted Lockwood Ritter (July 14, 1868 – October 15, 1951) was a United States district judge of the United States District Court for the Southern District of Florida. He was the thirteenth individual to be impeached by the United States House of Representatives and the fourth individual to be convicted and removed from office in an impeachment trial before the United States Senate .

Education and career

Born on July 14, 1868, in Indianapolis, Indiana, Ritter received a Bachelor of Philosophy degree in 1891, a Bachelor of Laws in 1892, and an Artium Magister degree in 1893, all from DePauw University. He entered private practice in Indianapolis from 1892 to 1895. He continued private practice in Denver, Colorado from 1895 to 1925. He was the Republican nominee for Governor of Colorado in 1912. In 1919, as a member of the Denver Lions Club, he attended the association's 3rd international convention in Chicago, where he proposed what would become the association's slogan - "liberty, intelligence, and our nation's safety", a backronym for the Lions name. In 1925, he moved to West Palm Beach, Florida for his wife's health and continued in private practice until 1929.
Ritter wrote a book, Washington as a Business Man, published in 1931 by Sears Publishing of New York.

Federal judicial service

Ritter was nominated by President Calvin Coolidge on January 23, 1929, to a seat on the United States District Court for the Southern District of Florida vacated by Judge Rhydon Mays Call. He was confirmed by the United States Senate on February 15, 1929, and received his commission the same day. His service terminated on April 17, 1936, due to his impeachment, conviction and removal from office.

Details of impeachment

On May 29, 1933, United States Representative J. Mark Wilcox of Florida introduced resolution (H. Res. 163) authorizing the House Judiciary Committee to investigate Ritter's conduct to "determine whether in the opinion of the committee he had been guilty of any high crime or misdemeanor." The resolution was referred to the Judiciary Committee.

On March 2, 1936, the United States House of Representatives voted to impeach Ritter by 181 votes to 146 on seven articles of impeachment. The proceedings were only the 13th impeachment case in the 147 years of Congress. The seven articles were:

Ordering the payment of "exorbitant" legal fees with intent to embezzle. Specifically, the House managers said Ritter engaged in champerty ("a proceeding whereby a person having no legitimate interest in a lawsuit abets it with money or services in the hope of profit") by "corruptly and unlawfully" receiving $4,500 from a former law partner, Albert L. Rankin. 
The House charged that Ritter had planned with Rankin and others to put Whitehall (the former Henry Morrison Flagler mansion and then a hotel, and now a museum) into receivership, and had given Rankin an "exorbitant fee" of $75,000, keeping $4,500 of it.
Showing favoritism in bankruptcy cases.
Two charges of practicing law while a judge.
Two charges of tax evasion (by filed false income tax returns in 1929 and 1930)
Bringing the judiciary into disrepute (accepting free meals and lodging at Whitehall during receivership proceedings).

Ritter's chief defense attorney was Frank P. Walsh. Three House managers prosecuted the case, with Sam Hobbs of Alabama leading.

On April 6, 1936, the United States Senate began his impeachment trial. Eleven days after the trial began, the Senate voted to acquit him of all but the last article (bringing the judiciary into disrepute), which he was convicted of 56–28, exactly the two-thirds necessary for conviction under the Constitution, the partisan balance of the United States Senate being approximately 72 Democrats to approximately 22 Republicans in the 74th United States Congress, and Ritter was removed from office on April 17, 1936. A motion to disqualify Ritter from all further federal office was defeated unanimously by the Senate.

Legal challenge to conviction

Ritter challenged the conviction in the federal Court of Claims on the grounds that the Senate could not convict him on a general charge of bringing the judiciary into disrepute if it was not able to convict him of a specific offense. The Court of Claims dismissed the case and held it did not have jurisdiction because the Senate was given the "sole power" to try impeachments under Clause 6, Section 3 of Article I of the United States Constitution.

Later career and death

After his removal from office, Ritter continued to practice law in Miami, Florida. He became ill while flying to the West Coast, and stopped in New Orleans, Louisiana. He subsequently traveled to Laurel, Mississippi to recover while staying with friends. He died on October 15, 1951, in Laurel.

Personal

Ritter's sister was Mary Ritter Beard, the wife of Charles A. Beard; both were noted historians.

References

Sources
 
 
 
 

1868 births
1951 deaths
20th-century American judges
American people convicted of tax crimes
Colorado Republicans
DePauw University alumni
Florida lawyers
Florida politicians convicted of crimes
Florida Republicans
Impeached United States federal judges removed from office
Indiana lawyers
Judges of the United States District Court for the Southern District of Florida
Lawyers from Denver
People from Indianapolis
People from Laurel, Mississippi
United States Attorneys for the Southern District of Florida
United States district court judges appointed by Calvin Coolidge